The 5th Annual Gotham Independent Film Awards, presented by the Independent Filmmaker Project, were held on September 19, 1995 and were hosted by Michael Moore. At the ceremony, Robert Shaye was honored with a Career Tribute with Abel Ferrara, Christopher Walken, Pauline Kael, and Juliet Taylor receiving the other individual awards.

Winners

Breakthrough Director (Open Palm Award)
 Rebecca Miller – Angela

Filmmaker Award
 Abel Ferrara

Actor Award
 Christopher Walken

Writer Award
 Pauline Kael

Below-the-Line Award
 Juliet Taylor, casting director

Career Tribute
 Robert Shaye

References

External links
 

1995
1995 film awards